Forte or Forté may refer to:

Music 
Forte (music), a musical dynamic meaning "loudly" or "strong"
Forte number, an ordering given to every pitch class set
Forte (notation program), a suite of musical score notation programs
Forte (vocal group), a classical crossover singing trio

Computing 
Forte 4GL, a proprietary application server
Forté Agent, an email and news client used on the Windows operating system
Forte TeamWare, a family of development environments from Sun Microsystems
NetBeans IDE, formerly Forté for Java

Companies 
Forté Internet Software, makers of Forté Agent
Forte Land, a large-scale real estate company in Shanghai, China
Forte Group, a former British hotel company
Forte Design Systems, a high level synthesis software company in San Jose, California
Trust House Forte, a British hotel and catering firm

Fictional characters 
Forte Stollen, a character from the Galaxy Angel anime
Bass (Mega Man), a character in Mega Man known as "Forte" in Japanese
Bass.EXE, a character from the MegaMan NT Warrior series known as "Forte" in Japanese
Forte, a character in Beauty and the Beast: The Enchanted Christmas

Other uses 
Forte (surname)
8780 Forte, a main-belt minor planet
FORTE, the Fast On-orbit Rapid Recording of Transient Events satellite
Forte-class frigate, two French Navy warships
French frigate Forte (1794), in service 1794–1801
Forte (fencing), a fencing term for the "strong" part of the blade
Forte (typeface), by the Monotype Corporation included in various editions of Microsoft Office
Forte (horse), an American thoroughbred race horse
Kia Forte, a mid-size sedan car

See also 
Fort (disambiguation)
Fortes, a surname